Pleasant Valley High School is a public high school located in Jacksonville, Alabama. As of 2018–2019 The Calhoun County School District school had 448 students in grades 7 to 12.

Extracurricular activities
Pleasant Valley High School offers a variety of varsity sports. The Raiders compete in the Alabama High School Athletic Association in Class 3A.

References

External links
 Pleasant Valley High School website

Schools in Calhoun County, Alabama
Public middle schools in Alabama
Public high schools in Alabama
High schools in Jacksonville, Alabama
Jacksonville, Alabama
Educational institutions established in 1982
1982 establishments in Alabama